Kim Seok (born August 10, 1992) is a South Korean equestrian and former actor. He began his career as a child actor in 1997, starring in films and television dramas such as When I Turned Nine (2004), Seoul 1945 (2006) and Princess Hours (2006). In 1999, Kim was encouraged by his father to take up horseback riding in order to boost his stamina, but his skill in the sport led him to put his entertainment activities on hold in 2009 and focus on being a member of the Korean national equestrian team. He competed in the 2010 Asian Games in Guangzhou and the 2014 Asian Games in Incheon.

Filmography

Film

Television series

Awards and nominations

References

External links 
 Kim Seok Fan Cafe at Daum 
 
 
 

1992 births
Living people
South Korean male equestrians
South Korean male film actors
South Korean male television actors
South Korean male child actors
Equestrians at the 2010 Asian Games
Equestrians at the 2014 Asian Games
Equestrians at the 2018 Asian Games
Asian Games competitors for South Korea